Rubi-Con was a hacker convention that took place in Detroit, Michigan from 1999 to 2003 inclusive.  After folding in its fifth year, Rubi-Con organizers managed to destroy its name through a creative website prank thereby preventing others from using the reputation to build their own events.  This tactic was only partially successful, as the organizers of Notacon have historically used Rubi-Con in their own self promotions.

Rubi-Con was known for being a no-holds-barred, anything goes event, where speakers were free to speak their minds, and where fun was the order of the day above all else.  Occurrences included indoor pyrotechnics during presentations (2002) and a conference organizer being hospitalized for alcohol poisoning (2001).

Notable Quotations Overheard at Rubi-Con 
 "This isn't fucking Comdex, I want you to break something." —Denis A. Baldwin (Conference Organizer), Rubi-Con 2002
"Subvert me not, boy...I will not submit to your filthy propaganda." —Myrone Bagalay aka enorym/rü$╫  (Conference Organizer and founding member), Rubi-Con 1999–2003

Rubi-Con History 
 1999: The Holiday Inn, Dearborn, Michigan (May 28–30)
 2000: The Wyndham Garden Hotel, Romulus, Michigan. (Changed its name to Clarion Hotel the night before the event, making it difficult for many attendees to find.) (April 28–30)
 2001: The Ramada Hotel, Detroit, Michigan (Across the street from a local SBC Communications office) (April 6–8)
 2002: The Marriott, Romulus, Michigan (April 5–7)
 2003: The Holiday Inn, Dearborn, Michigan (March 28–30)

See also 
 Rubicon History - Provided by one of the organizers
 Rubicon 3 Audio - Mirror by Jason Scott
 Rubicon 5 Audio - Mirror by Jason Scott
 1999 Site The First Year
 2000 Site
 2001 Site
 2002 Site In all of its huge background glory
 2003 Site With Java

Hacker conventions
Culture of Detroit